Bhutan is a member of South Asian Zone of Olympic Council Of Asia and had participated in all 13 South Asian Games since beginning.

Detalied Medal Table

References

South Asian Games
 
Nations at the South Asian Games